Stay on These Roads is the third studio album by Norwegian band A-ha, released on 3 May 1988 by Warner Bros. Records. Six singles were released from the album.

Recording
A Synclavier, Sequential Circuits Prophet 5, Yamaha DX-7, Roland D-50, and Roland Juno-60 or Roland Juno-106 synthesizers were used in the recording of this album, as was a Yamaha RX-5 drum machine.

Release and reception

The album peaked at number 148 on the US Billboard 200. It was another big hit by A-ha internationally, selling over 4 million copies worldwide. Stay on These Roads achieved Platinum status in Brazil and Gold in the UK, Switzerland, the Netherlands and Germany and Double Platinum status in France. It reached number two in the European top-100 albums sales chart.

William Ruhlmann of AllMusic said "in the U.K., the album became the group's third straight to peak at number two, though it charted for a shorter period than the first two albums, and there were four Top 25 hits—the title track, 'The Blood That Moves the Body,' 'Touchy!,' and 'You Are the One'." Also included was a re-recording of A-ha's 1987 theme from the James Bond movie The Living Daylights, which, in its single version, was a U.K. number five that missed the U.S. charts.

Lead single "Stay on These Roads", number one in Norway, was a hit across Europe, including top-five showings in the UK, France, Austria and Ireland and top-ten chartings in Germany, the Netherlands, Sweden and Switzerland. Stay on These Roads includes three more hit singles, "The Blood That Moves The Body", "Touchy!" and "You Are the One", though a final single, "There's Never a Forever Thing", was released only in Brazil.

Track listing

All lyrics written by Paul Waaktaar-Savoy; music composers listed below.
Side one
 "Stay on These Roads" – 4:45 (Furuholmen, Harket, Waaktaar)
 "The Blood That Moves the Body" – 4:06 (Waaktaar)
 "Touchy!" – 4:34 (Furuholmen, Harket, Waaktaar)
 "This Alone Is Love" – 5:15 (Furuholmen, Waaktaar)
 "Hurry Home" – 4:37 (Furuholmen, Waaktaar)
Side two
 "The Living Daylights" – 4:47 (Barry, Waaktaar)
 "There's Never a Forever Thing" – 2:53 (Waaktaar)
 "Out of Blue Comes Green" – 6:42 (Waaktaar)
 "You Are the One" – 3:51 (Furuholmen, Waaktaar)
 "You'll End up Crying" – 2:06 (Waaktaar)

2015 Deluxe edition
Disc 1
 "Stay on These Roads" (2015 Remastered)
 "The Blood That Moves the Body" (2015 Remastered)
 "Touchy!" (2015 Remastered)
 "This Alone Is Love" (2015 Remastered)
 "Hurry Home" (2015 Remastered)
 "The Living Daylights" (2015 Remastered)
 "There's Never a Forever Thing" (2015 Remastered)
 "Out of Blue Comes Green" (2015 Remastered)
 "You Are the One" (2015 Remastered)
 "You'll End up Crying" (2015 Remastered)
 "Stay on These Roads" (Extended Remix)
 "You Are the One" (12" Remix)
 "The Living Daylights (Extended Version)
 "The Blood That Moves the Body" (Extended Remix)
 "Touchy!" (Go-Go Mix)

Disc 2 - Demos & Alternate Versions
 "Stay on These Roads" (Early Version)
 "The Blood That Moves the Body" (Demo)
 "Touchy!"
 "This Alone Is Love" (Demo)
 "You Are the One" (Early Version)
 "Cold River" (1987 Demo)
 "Hurry Home" (Demo)
 "I'll Never Find Streetful City" (Demo)
 "The Living Daylights" (Demo)
 "There's Never a Forever Thing" (Demo)
 "Out of Blue Comes Green" (Alternate Mix)
 "You'll End up Crying" (Demo)
 "You Are the One" (Alternate Version)
 "Touchy!" (Demo)
 "Umbrella" (Rendezvous Demo)
 "Thus Ended Our Love Affair" (Demo)
 "There's Never a Forever Thing" (Acoustic Version)
 "Evitar" (Demo)
 "You Are the One" (Demo)
 "Sail On My Love" (Writing Session)

Personnel 
A-ha
 Morten Harket – lead and backing vocals
 Magne Furuholmen – keyboards, bass and drum programming, backing vocals
 Paul Waaktaar-Savoy – guitars, strings, bass and drum programming, backing vocals

 Contributions to the recording of the album: Steve Sidwell, Ben Robbins, Anne Dudley, Randy Hope-Taylor, Øystein Jevanord, Kick Horns.

Production and Technical
 Alan Tarney – producer 
 Gerry Kitchingham – recording engineer 
 John Hudson – mixing 
 Jeri Heiden – art direction
 Just Loomis – band photography 
 Stuart Watson – "still life" photography

Charts

Weekly charts

Year-end charts

Certifications and sales

References

External links
 Lyrics
 Tour of 1988-1989, in German

1988 albums
A-ha albums
Albums produced by Alan Tarney
Warner Records albums